Walter Rayner was Charlton Athletic's first manager as a professional football team. He was a former Tottenham Hotspur coach. He was sacked after five years and banned from football management because of financial affairs under his management.

External links
Walter Rayner profile from the Charlton Athletic website

Year of birth missing
Year of death missing
English football managers
Charlton Athletic F.C. managers